Ecrobia ventrosa, common name spire snail,  is a European species of small brackish water snail with a gill and an operculum,  an aquatic gastropod mollusk in the family Hydrobiidae.

Distribution
This species occurs on the coasts of:
 Iceland
 Norway
 Great Britain
 Ireland
 France
 Baltic Sea
 Black Sea
 White Sea 
The distribution type is coastal Mediterranean–Atlantic.

Description

For terms see gastropod shell

The 3–4 x 1.5–2 mm.  shell has 5–7 convex whorls which are slightly more convex than those of Hydrobia acuta neglecta. Smaller shells with 5 whorls are slightly less slender than those of Hydrobia neglecta. The suture is deep. The aperture is rounded upside (or only slightly pointed) and attached to the last whorl. The lip is weakly developed. The shell is very finely striated and in colour translucent, glossy yellow-brown, usually hidden by a matt deposit.

Certain identification requires dissection. The penis has a pointed tip, not a blunt tip as in Hydrobia acuta neglecta.

References

 de Kluijver, M.J.; Ingalsuo, S.S.; de Bruyne, R.H. (2000). Macrobenthos of the North Sea [CD-ROM]: 1. Keys to Mollusca and Brachiopoda. World Biodiversity Database CD-ROM Series. Expert Center for Taxonomic Identification (ETI): Amsterdam, The Netherlands. . 1 cd-rom pp
 Rolán E., 2005. Malacological Fauna From The Cape Verde Archipelago. Part 1, Polyplacophora and Gastropoda.

External links 

 Hydrobia ventrosa at AnimalBase
 
  Oliverio, Marco (2006). Gastropoda Prosobranchia Caenogastropoda, in: Revisione della Checklist della fauna marina Italiana

Ecrobia
Molluscs of the Atlantic Ocean
Molluscs of the Mediterranean Sea
Fauna of the Arctic Ocean
Fauna of the Baltic Sea
Fauna of the North Sea
Gastropods described in 1803
Taxa named by George Montagu (naturalist)